Otar Martsvaladze (born 14 July 1984) is a former professional Georgian footballer who played for the national team.

Career

Club
Otar Martsvaladze was born in Tbilisi. He spent first four years of his professional career at WIT Georgia, where he secured championship title in 2004. Two years later Martsvaladze was named the best player of the season. 

He signed for Dynamo Kyiv along with countryman Kakhaber Aladashvili in 2006.

In 2014 he returned to Umaglesi Liga and initially joined Dinamo Tbilisi for six months, followed by another year at Dila Gori. His prolific performance was duly appreciated with Otar named among the best three players of the 2014–15 season. 

On 22 June 2016, Martsvaladze signed for FC Ordabasy in the Kazakhstan Premier League.

Rustavi turned out the last club Martsvaladze played for in 2018. At the age of 34 he ended his career and moved to futsal.

International career
He was also a member of Georgian national football team. Martsvaladze made his debut in the 2006 Malta International Football Tournament, he then played five games in the UEFA Euro 2008 qualifying and five more friendlies. In 2011 he assisted Levan Kobiashvili in the 90th minute in Georgia's 1–0 win against Croatia.

Otar Martsvaladze bade farewell to the national team during a ceremony held in March 2019.

Personal life
His father was killed in a car crash, Otar was in the same car but received lighter injuries.

Career statistics

Club

International

International goals

Honours
 Umaglesi Liga best player: 2005–06

 Russian First Division top scorer: 2010 (21 goals).

References

External links
 
 
 

1984 births
Living people
Association football forwards
Footballers from Georgia (country)
Georgia (country) international footballers
Georgia (country) under-21 international footballers
Expatriate footballers from Georgia (country)
FC WIT Georgia players
FC Dynamo Kyiv players
FC Anzhi Makhachkala players
FC Hoverla Uzhhorod players
FC Volga Nizhny Novgorod players
FC Krasnodar players
FC SKA-Khabarovsk players
FC Spartak Vladikavkaz players
Expatriate footballers in Ukraine
Expatriate footballers in Russia
Expatriate footballers in Kazakhstan
Footballers from Tbilisi
Erovnuli Liga players
Russian Premier League players
Ukrainian Premier League players
Kazakhstan Premier League players
FC Dinamo Tbilisi players
FC Dynamo-2 Kyiv players
Expatriate sportspeople from Georgia (country) in Ukraine
FC Tosno players
FC Ordabasy players
FC Metalurgi Rustavi players